Hydriomena iolanthe is a species of moth in the family Geometridae. It is indigenous to New Zealand. This species is based on a single specimen that is now lost and has not been matched to any known species. As such it is classified as data deficient by the Department of Conservation.

Taxonomy

This species was first described by George Hudson in 1939 using a female specimen collected at Lake Harris by F. S. Oliver in January 1918. Due to the single specimen being damaged and lacking antennae, Hudson was uncertain of the generic position of the species. He therefore named the species Hydriomena (or Xanthorhoe) iolanthe. The illustration is labelled Hydriomena? iolanthe. The classification of New Zealand endemic moths within the genus Hydriomena is regarded as unsatisfactory and in need of revision. As such this species is currently also known as Hydriomena (s.l.) iolanthe. This species may prove synonymous as the hototype specimen has been lost and it is possible it is a European species that was mislabelled. It was listed in the New Zealand Inventory of Biodiversity as nomen dubium.

Description
Hudson described the species as follows:

Distribution
This species is indigenous to New Zealand. This species is found on the Otago Lakes Fiordland border. It is only known from the type locality of Lake Harris on the Routeburn Track.

Biology and behaviour
This species is on the wing in January.

Host species
It has been hypothesised that the host of the larvae of H. iolanthe is possibly a species of Coprosma. The reasoning behind this hypothesis is that the illustration of the species resembles an Austrocidaria and Coprosma plants are the host for species in that genus.

Conservation status
This species has been classified as having the data deficient conservation status under the New Zealand Threat Classification System. Hudson's description was based on a single specimen which is now lost. The illustration by Hudson has not been matched to any known endemic or adventive species.

References

Moths described in 1939
Moths of New Zealand
Hydriomena
Taxa named by George Hudson